The Private Lesson (French: La leçon particulière) is a 1968 French drama film directed by Michel Boisrond and starring Nathalie Delon, Renaud Verley and Robert Hossein. It was shot on location around Paris and Avoriaz in the French Alps.

Synopsis
A school student falls in love with a slightly older woman, while her racing driver boyfriend is away in America.

Cast
Nathalie Delon as Frederique Dampierre
Renaud Verley as Olivier Fermond
Robert Hossein as Enrico Fontana
Katia Christine as 	Christine 
Martine Sarcey as La mère d'Olivier
Nicole Desailly as La concierge
Bernard Le Coq as Jean-Pierre
Michel Boisrond as Le père d'Olivier 
Henri Lambert as Le motard

References

Bibliography 
Parish, James Robert. Film Actors Guide: Western Europe. Scarecrow Press, 1977.

External links 

1968 films
1968 drama films
French drama films
1960s French-language films
Films directed by Michel Boisrond
Films shot in Paris
Films set in Paris
1960s French films